Rufus E. Jones (August 21, 1940 – October 20, 2019) was an American politician and businessman.

Early life

Jones grew up in the Boxtown neighborhood of South Memphis where his father operated Jones Supermarket. As a youngster, he went in the grocery business with his father. Jones and his father also operated another South Memphis grocery store, Jones Big Star. He graduated from Booker T. Washington High School and Michigan State University.

Political career
Jones succeeded his childhood friend Emmitt Ford in the Tennessee House of Representatives and served from 1981 to 1996. He was a Democrat. He was succeeded by Barbara Cooper. Jones was the Tennessean delegate to the Democratic National Convention in 1996.

Personal

He was married to Marvis Kneeland-Jones, a retired schoolteacher. She was a member of the Memphis State Eight, the first group of African-American students to attend the University of Memphis, five years after the Supreme Court ruled in favor of desegregation in Brown v. Board of Education.

References

1940 births
2019 deaths
Politicians from Memphis, Tennessee
Businesspeople from Tennessee
Democratic Party members of the Tennessee House of Representatives
Michigan State University alumni
American grocers
20th-century American businesspeople